Drew Kittleson (born April 2, 1989) is an American professional golfer from Scottsdale, Arizona.

Kittleson played college golf at Florida State University. As a member of the Seminoles lineup, he helped the team win its first ever Atlantic Coast Conference golf championship.

Kittleson advanced to the finals of the 2008 U.S. Amateur at Pinehurst before falling to Danny Lee, 5 & 4. With the second-place finish, he qualified to play in the 2009 Masters Tournament at Augusta National and the 2009 U.S. Open at Bethpage Black Course.

Kittleson turned professional after graduating from FSU in 2011.

Amateur wins
2009 Golfweek Conference Challenge
2010 NCAA Central Region
2011 Gator Invitational, Seminole Intercollegiate

Results in major championships

CUT = missed the half-way cut

U.S. national team appearances
Amateur
 Junior Ryder Cup: 2006

References

External links
Florida State player biography
2009 Masters profile

American male golfers
Florida State Seminoles men's golfers
Golfers from Scottsdale, Arizona
1989 births
Living people